Pavel Aleksandrovich Kalashkin (Павел Александрович Калашкин) (born on 26 September 1970, in Kazan) is a Russian rugby league footballer and rugby coach, acting as head coach of the Russian national beach rugby team. He is a Master of Sports of Russia.

Career
Known for his performances for Strela Kazan, a many-times champion and winner of the Russian Rugby League Cup. He also represented Russia in the 2000 World Cup. Kalashkin played in all three matches from the bench.

As a coach, he is known for coaching the Kazan rugby club Energya, whose presidency he also held (the club won the FRL-2014 with him), and Strela Kazan. He was also appointed Executive Director of the Rugby Federation of the Republic of Tatarstan, as well, as organizer of the rugby sevens competitions of the 2013 Summer Universiade.

References

Living people
Russian rugby league players
Russia national rugby league team players
1970 births
Sportspeople from Kazan